Events from the year 1945 in Ireland.

Incumbents
 President:
 Douglas Hyde (until 24 June 1945)
 Seán T. O'Kelly (from 25 June 1945)
 Taoiseach: Éamon de Valera (FF)
 Tánaiste: 
 Seán T. O'Kelly (FF) (until 14 June 1945)
 Seán Lemass (FF) (from 14 June 1945)
 Minister for Finance: 
 Seán T. O'Kelly (FF) (until 14 June 1945)
 Frank Aiken (FF) (from 19 June 1945)
 Chief Justice: Timothy Sullivan
 Dáil: 12th
 Seanad: 5th

Events

 1 January – most public transport came under the control of Córas Iompair Éireann.
 12 January – the people of Ireland donated £1,000,000 to the starving people of Italy.
 13 April – Dáil Éireann sat for 20 minutes to express sympathy and pay tribute to US President Franklin Delano Roosevelt, who died the previous day. The House was then adjourned.
 27 April – the Fine Gael party nominated Seán Mac Eoin as their presidential election candidate in opposition to the Minister for Finance Seán T. O'Kelly.
 2 May
 In one of the most controversial episodes of his premiership, Taoiseach Éamon de Valera called to the German Ambassador to express his sympathy following the death of Adolf Hitler.
 In the last Irish shipping loss due to World War II, motor fishing trawler Naom Garvan caught a naval mine in her trawl off Helvick Head, Dungarvan; all three crew were lost.
 7 May – reports of a German surrender brought students of Trinity College Dublin onto the roof of the university singing the English and French national anthems. A riot ensued following the burning of the Irish tricolour.
 11 May – Government censorship of the media was lifted.
 16 May – Éamon de Valera replied in a radio broadcast to Winston Churchill's criticism of Irish neutrality.
 18 May – Éamon de Valera announced £12 million food and clothing aid programmed for Europe.
 22 May – Irish Legal Terms Act signed into law.
 25 June – Seán T. O'Kelly was inaugurated as the second President of Ireland.
 July – Rannóg an Aistriúcháin, the Oireachtas translation service, published Litriú na Gaeilge: Lámhleabhar an Chaighdeáin Oifigiúil ("Irish orthography: a handbook of the official standard").
 24 July – John F. Kennedy visited Dublin as a journalist and met the Taoiseach, Éamon de Valera. He filed a story for the New York Journal-American on 29 July entitled, "Eamon de Valera Seeks to Unite All Ireland: Eire Premier Answers Dillon on Constitutional Rights".
 21 August – two nationalist MPs took the Oath of Allegiance and entered the Parliament of the United Kingdom at Westminster.
 16 September – Count John McCormack, the famous tenor, died in Dublin aged 61.
 15 October – Professor Eoin MacNeill died in Dublin aged 77. He was a founder-member of the Gaelic League and the Irish Volunteers.
 3 December – oranges went on sale in Ireland for the first time since the end of World War II.
 14 December – the Nuremberg Trials heard the story of German plans to create a revolution in Ireland during the War.
 25 December – in his presidential address President Seán T. O'Kelly asked the youth of Ireland to make a particular effort to restore the Irish language.
 A "popular edition" of the Constitution of Ireland is published by the Stationery Office, amending the Irish language text.

Arts and literature
 J. Sheridan Le Fanu's Green Tea and Other Ghost Stories was published posthumously in the United States.
 Ina Boyle's first symphony, Glencree, composed in 1924–27, received its first complete performance at a Raidió Éireann studio concert.
 E. J. Moeran's Cello Concerto incorporated fragments of Irish music.
 Establishment of Irish language publisher Sáirséal agus Dill in Dublin by Seán Sairséal Ó hÉigeartaigh and his wife Bríd Ní Mhaoileoin.

Sport

Football

League of Ireland
Winners: Cork United

FAI Cup
Winners: Shamrock Rovers 1–0 Bohemians.

Golf
 The Irish Open was not played due to The Emergency.

Births

 8 January – Kevin Conneff, bodhrán player and singer with The Chieftains.
 12 January
 Tony Maher, Cork hurler.
 Eddie O'Brien, Cork hurler.
 2 February – Billy Morgan, Cork Gaelic footballer and manager.
 5 February – Michael Courtney, titular archbishop of Eanach Dúin and Apostolic Nuncio to Burundi (assassinated 2003).
 12 February – Jimmy Keaveney, Dublin Gaelic footballer.
 17 February – Brenda Fricker, actress.
 4 March – Tara Browne, socialite (died 1966).
 17 March – Paddy Mulligan, soccer player.
 March – Bernard Durkan, Fine Gael TD for Kildare North.

 2 April – Batt O'Keeffe, Fianna Fáil TD for Cork North-West and Minister of State.
 8 April – Diarmuid Martin, Roman Catholic Archbishop of Dublin and Primate of Ireland.
 18 April – Margaret Hassan, aid worker in Iraq, kidnapped and murdered by Iraqi insurgents (died 2004).
 20 April – Alan Dukes, leader of Fine Gael and TD, Director General of the Institute of European Affairs.
 26 April – Séamus Kirk, Fianna Fáil TD for Louth.
 27 April – Dinny McGinley, Fine Gael TD for Donegal South-West.
 4 May – Jim Higgins, Fine Gael TD, Senator and Member of the European Parliament.
 7 May
 Susan Denham (née Gageby), Chief Justice of Ireland.
 Alexis FitzGerald Jnr, Fine Gael TD and Senator.
 Christy Moore, folk singer.
 21 May – Éamonn Cregan, Limerick Gaelic footballer and hurler, manager.
 1 June 
 Niamh Bhreathnach, Labour Party politician, TD and Minister for Education (died 2023)
 Jarlath McDonagh, Fine Gael politician.
 6 June – Denis Coughlan, Cork Gaelic footballer and hurler.
 11 June – Patrick Joseph McGrath, Irish-American bishop.
 17 June – Pat Hickey, judoka and Olympic sports administrator.
 20 June – Denis Brennan, Bishop of Ferns (2006–2021).
 23 June – Paul Costelloe, fashion designer.
 30 June – Sean Scully, painter.
 June – Nora Owen, Fine Gael TD and Minister for Justice.
 1 July – Jack Wall, Labour Party TD for Kildare South.
 11 July – Patrick Joseph McGrath, second Roman Catholic Bishop of San Jose in California.
 July – John Dardis, Progressive Democrats Senator.
 3 August – Eamon Dunphy, footballer, commentator and broadcaster.
 14 August - Tony Scannell, actor.
 12 September – Maria Aitken, actress, writer and director.
 13 September – Niall FitzGerald, businessman.
 15 September – Donie Cassidy, Fianna Fáil TD representing Longford–Westmeath, businessman.
 20 September – Eamonn Walsh, Labour Party TD, local councillor.
 September – Gerald McCarthy, Cork hurling manager and player.
 19 November – Christie Hennessy, folk singer songwriter (died 2007).
 6 December – Noel Skehan, Kilkenny hurler.
 8 December – John Banville, novelist.
 14 December – Bernard O'Donoghue, poet and academic.
 17 December – John Neill, Church of Ireland Archbishop of Dublin, Bishop of Glendalough, Primate of Ireland and Metropolitan.
 24 December – Noel Davern, Fianna Fáil TD representing Tipperary South, Cabinet Minister, Member of the European Parliament.
Full date unknown
 Richie Bennis, Limerick hurling manager.
 Justin McCarthy, Cork hurler, Waterford hurling manager.
 Philip Pettit, philosopher and political theorist.
 Kieran Purcell, Kilkenny hurler.
 Pad Joe Whelehan, Offaly hurler, manager.

Deaths

 30 January – Patrick Belton, Fianna Fáil and Cumann na nGaedheal TD, President of the anti-communist Irish Christian Front (born 1885).
 4 April – Henry Guinness, engineer, banker and independent member of the Seanad 1922–34 (born 1858).
 5 May – Frederick Crowley, Fianna Fáil politician (born 1890).
 20 July – Paddy Mahon, golfer (born c. 1907).
 24 July – Kitty Kiernan, fiancée of the assassinated Michael Collins (born 1893).
 3 October – Dermod O'Brien, painter (born 1865).
 13 October – Joseph MacRory, Cardinal, Archbishop of Armagh and Primate of All Ireland (born 1861).
 15 October – Eoin MacNeill, scholar, nationalist and revolutionary (born 1867).
 24 October – Frederick Field, Royal Navy Admiral of the Fleet and First Sea Lord (born 1871).
 6 December – Edmund Dwyer-Gray, politician and 29th Premier of Tasmania in 1939 (born 1870).
 20 December – John M. Lyle, architect in Canada (born 1872).

References

 
1940s in Ireland
Ireland
Independent Ireland in World War II
Years of the 20th century in Ireland